Mario Zabalaga (born 8 May 1938) is a Bolivian footballer. He played in six matches for the Bolivia national football team from 1963 to 1967. He was also part of Bolivia's squad that won the 1963 South American Championship.

References

1938 births
Living people
Bolivian footballers
Bolivia international footballers
Association football defenders
C.D. Jorge Wilstermann players
Club Aurora players